In survival, the rule of threes involves the priorities in order to survive. The rule, depending on the place where one lives, may allow people to effectively prepare for emergencies and determine decision-making in case of injury or danger posed by the environment.

Rule 
Normally, the rule of threes contains the following:

 You can survive three minutes without breathable air (unconsciousness), or in icy water.
 You can survive three hours in a harsh environment (extreme heat or cold).
 You can survive three days without drinkable water.
 You can survive three weeks without food.

Each line assumes that the one(s) before it are met. For example, if you have a large quantity of food and water yet are exposed to the environment, then the harsh conditions rule applies. The rule may sometimes be useful in determining the order of priority when in a life-threatening situation, and is a generalization (or rule of thumb), not scientifically accurate. 

Additional generalizations may be presented with the rule, though they are not considered part of the "Rule of threes" and are also not scientifically accurate. For example, it might be said that it takes a three-second psychological reaction time to make a decision during an emergency, or that an individual can last three months without hope.

Accuracy

Water 
The amount of time a person can survive without a source of water (including food which contains water) depends on the individual and the temperature. As temperature increases, so does water loss, decreasing the amount of time a person can survive without water. The longest anyone has ever survived without water was 18 days. The source of the "3 days" number likely comes from an experiment two scientists did in 1944 where they ate only dry food for a period of time; one ended the experiment at 3 days in, and the other at 4 days in. However since they stopped the experiment before being in any real danger, the actual survival time at room temperature likely exceeds 3-4 days. However, at temperatures greater than room temperature, dehydration can occur very quickly, and death can occur in a matter of hours rather than days. In these cases people typically die of heat stroke first, not terminal dehydration. One person was purported to survive 7 days in the desert, 6 of these without water, without suffering heat stroke as the temperature reached no higher than  during his ordeal. However, he had reached the third stage of dehydration, which is 80-90% fatal; this likely represents an upper limit of survival at high temperatures.

References 

Survival skills